The committees of correspondence were, prior to the outbreak of the American Revolutionary War, a collection of American political organizations that sought to coordinate opposition to British Parliament and, later, support for American independence. The brainchild of Samuel Adams, a Patriot from Boston, the committees sought to establish, through the writing of letters, an underground network of communication among Patriot leaders in the Thirteen Colonies. The committees were instrumental in setting up the First Continental Congress, which met in Philadelphia.

Function 
The function of the committees was to alert the residents of a given colony of the actions taken by the British Crown, and to disseminate information from cities to the countryside. The news was typically spread via hand-written letters or printed pamphlets, which would be carried by couriers on horseback or aboard ships. The committees were responsible for ensuring that this news accurately reflected the views, and was dispatched to the proper receiving groups. Many correspondents were members of colonial legislative assemblies, and others were also active in the Sons of Liberty and Stamp Act Congress.

A total of about 7,000 to 8,000 Patriots served on these committees at the colonial and local levels, comprising most of the leadership in their communities; Loyalists were naturally excluded. The committees became the leaders of the American resistance to Great Britain, and largely determined the war effort at the state and local level. When Congress decided to boycott British products, the colonial and local committees took charge, examining merchant records and publishing the names of merchants who attempted to defy the boycott.

The committees promoted patriotism and home manufacturing, advising Americans to avoid luxuries, and lead a more simple life. The committees gradually extended their power over many aspects of American public life. They set up espionage networks to identify disloyal elements, displaced royal officials, and helped diminish the influence of the British government in each of the colonies. In late 1774 and early 1775, they supervised the elections of provincial conventions, which began the operation of a true colonial government.

History

The earliest committees of correspondence were formed temporarily to address a particular problem. Once a resolution was achieved, they were disbanded. The first formal committee was established in Boston in 1764 to rally opposition to the Currency Act and unpopular reforms imposed on the customs service.

During the Stamp Act Crisis the following year, New York formed a committee to urge common resistance among its neighbors to the new taxes. The Province of Massachusetts Bay correspondents responded by urging other colonies to send delegates to the Stamp Act Congress that fall. The resulting committees disbanded after the crisis was over.

Boston, whose radical leaders thought it was under increasingly hostile threats by the royal government, set up the first long-standing committee with the approval of a town meeting in late 1772. By spring 1773, Patriots decided to follow the Massachusetts system and began to set up their own committees in each colony. Virginia appointed an eleven-member committee in March, quickly followed by Rhode Island, Connecticut, New Hampshire, and South Carolina. By February 1774, eleven colonies had set up their own committees; of the thirteen colonies that eventually rebelled, only North Carolina and Pennsylvania had not.

Massachusetts
In Massachusetts, in November 1772, Samuel Adams, Joseph Warren, and Mercy Otis Warren formed a committee in response to the Gaspée Affair and in relation to the recent British decision to have the salaries of the royal governor and judges be paid by the Crown rather than the colonial assembly, which removed the colony of its means of holding public officials accountable to their constituents. In the following months, more than one hundred other committees were formed in the towns and villages of Massachusetts. The Massachusetts committee had its headquarters in Boston and under the leadership of Adams became a model for other Patriot groups. The meeting when establishing the committee gave it the task of stating "the rights of the colonists, and of this province in particular, as men, as Christians, and as subjects; to communicate and publish the same to the several towns in this province and to the world as the sense of this town."

Virginia
In March 1773, Dabney Carr proposed the formation of a permanent Committee of Correspondence before the Virginia House of Burgesses. Virginia's own committee was formed on March 12, 1773.  Its members were Peyton Randolph, Robert Carter Nicholas, Richard Bland, Richard Henry Lee, Benjamin Harrison, Edmund Pendleton, Patrick Henry, Dudley Digges, Dabney Carr, Archibald Cary, and Thomas Jefferson.

Pennsylvania
Among the last to form a committee of correspondence, Pennsylvania did so at a meeting in Philadelphia on May 20, 1774. In a compromise between the more radical and more conservative factions of political activists the committee was formed by combining the lists each proposed. That committee of 19 diversified and grew to 43, then to 66 and finally to two different groups of 100 between May 1774 and its dissolution in September 1776. One hundred sixty men participated in one or more of the committees, but only four were regularly elected to all of them: Thomas Barclay, John Cox Jr., John Dickinson, and Joseph Reed.

Delaware
According to Hancock (1973), a committee of correspondence was established by Thomas McKean after ten years of agitation centered in New Castle County. In neighboring Kent County Caesar Rodney set up a second committee, followed by Sussex County. Following the recommendation of Congress in 1774, the committees were replaced by elected "committees of inspection" with a subcommittee of correspondence. The new committees specialize in intelligence work, especially the identification of men opposed to the Patriot cause. The committees were in the lead in demanding independence. The correspondence committees exchanged information with others in Boston and Philadelphia, and elsewhere. Their leadership often was drawn upon to provide Delaware with executive leaders. The committees of inspection used publicity as weapons to suppress disaffection and encourage patriotism. With imports from Britain cut off, the committees sought to make America self-sufficient, so they encouraged the raising of flax and sheep for wool. The committees helped organize local militia in the hundreds and later in the counties and all of Delaware. With their encouragement, the Delaware Assembly elected delegates to Congress favorable to independence.

North Carolina
By 1773, the political situation had deteriorated. There was concern about the courts. Massachusetts' young and ardent Boston patriot, Josiah Quincy Jr. visited North Carolina staying five days. He spent the night of March 26, 1773, at Cornelius Harnett's home near Wilmington, North Carolina. The two discussed and drew up plans for a Committee of Correspondence. The committee's purpose: communicate circumstances and revolutionary sentiment among the colonies. It was after this meeting that Quincy dubbed Harnett the "Samuel Adams of North Carolina."

The North Carolina Committee of Correspondence formed in December 1773 in Wilmington. Although Harnett was absent, he was made chairman of the committee.  Other members included  John Harvey, Robert Howe, Richard Caswell, Edward Vail, John Ashe, Joseph Hewes, Samuel Johnston, and William Hooper.

New York

In response to the news that the port of Boston would be closed under the Boston Port Act, an advertisement was posted at the Coffee-house on Wall-street in New York City, a noted place of resort for shipmasters and merchants, inviting merchants to meet on May 16, 1774, at the Fraunces Tavern "in order to consult on measures proper to be pursued on the present critical and important situation." At that meeting, with Isaac Low as chair, they resolved to nominated a fifty-member committee of correspondence to be submitted to the public, and on May 17 they published a notice calling on the public to meet at the Coffee-house on May 19 at 1:00PM to approve the committee and appoint others as they may see fit. At the meeting on May 19, Francis Lewis was also nominated and the entire Committee of Fifty-one was confirmed.

On May 23, the committee met at the coffee-house and appointed Isaac Low as permanent chairman and John Alsop as deputy chairman. The committee then formed a subcommittee which reported a letter in response to the letters from Boston, calling for a "Congress of Deputies from the Colonies" to be assembled (which became known as the First Continental Congress), which was approved by the committee. On May 30, the Committee formed a subcommittee to write a letter to the supervisors of the counties of New York to exhort them to also form similar committees of correspondence, which letter was adopted on a meeting of the Committee on May 31.

On July 4, 1774, a resolution was approved to appoint five delegates contingent upon their confirmation by the freeholders of the City and County of New York, and request that the other counties also send delegates. Isaac Low, John Alsop, James Duane, Philip Livingston, and John Jay were then appointed, and the public of the City and County was invited to attend City Hall and concur in the appointments on July 7. This caused friction with the more radical Sons of Liberty (Committee of Mechanics) faction, who held the Meeting in the Fields on July 6. Three counties (Westchester, Duchess, and Albany) acquiesced to the five delegates, while three counties (Kings, Suffolk, and Orange) sent delegates of their own.

Other colonies
By July 1773, Rhode Island, Connecticut, New Hampshire, and South Carolina had also formed committees.

With Pennsylvania's action in May 1774 all of the colonies that eventually rebelled had such committees.

The colonial committees successfully organized common resistance to the Tea Act and even recruited physicians who wrote drinking tea would make Americans "weak, effeminate, and valetudinarian for life."

These permanent committees performed the important planning necessary for the First Continental Congress, which convened in September 1774. The Second Congress created its own committee of correspondence to communicate the American interpretation of events to foreign nations.

These committees were replaced during the revolution with Provincial Congresses.

By 1780, committees of correspondence had also been formed in Great Britain and Ireland.

See also
Committee of Safety (American Revolution)
Founding Fathers of the United States

Footnotes

References

Brown, Richard D. Revolutionary Politics in Massachusetts: The Boston Committee of Correspondence and the Towns, 1772-1774 (1976)

Primary sources
 Revolutionary Virginia: The Road to Independence. Vol. 2, The Committees and the Second Convention, 1773-1775: A Documentary Record edited by William J. Van Schreeven, and Robert L. Schribner, (1974)

Further reading

 Archived papers of the Committee of Correspondence, 1952–1969, at Smith College.

1764 establishments in Massachusetts
Organizations established in 1764
American Revolution
Committees
Samuel Adams